The Floor Above is a 1914 American silent mystery film directed by James Kirkwood. The film stars Earle Foxe, Henry Walthall and Dorothy Gish in the lead roles.

Cast
Earle Foxe
Henry B. Walthall as Stephen Pryde
Dorothy Gish as Stella Ford
Estelle Mardo (as Estelle Coffin) as Grace Burton
Ralph Lewis as Jerome

American silent feature films
1914 films
American mystery films
American black-and-white films
1910s mystery films
Films directed by James Kirkwood Sr.
1910s American films
Silent mystery films